Teratotarsa is a genus of beetles in the family Carabidae, containing the following species:

 Teratotarsa crenicollis Straneo, 1965
 Teratotarsa minor Peringuey, 1926
 Teratotarsa schouberti Tschitscherine, 1893
 Teratotarsa superciliaris (Peringuey, 1926)

References

Pterostichinae